Holyday is often a surname. Notable people with the surname include:

Barten Holyday (1593–1661), English clergyman, writer and poet
Doug Holyday (born 1942), Canadian politician
Stephen Holyday (born 1976), Canadian politician

Paintings
 Holyday, by James Tissot

See also
Holiday (disambiguation)